Auguste or Kolka, My Friend is a 1961 French comedy film directed by Pierre Chevalier. It stars Fernand Raynaud, Valérie Lagrange and Jean Poiret.

Cast
Fernand Raynaud as Auguste Roussel
Valérie Lagrange as Françoise
Jean Poiret as Georges Flower
Roger Carel as Albert, the stepbrother
Pierre Palau as Boyer de l'Ain 
Paul Préboist as Dupont
Simone Berthier as Auguste's servant

References

External links

French comedy films
1961 films
Films directed by Pierre Chevalier
1961 comedy films
1960s French-language films
1960s French films